Paul Michael Green (born 15 April 1987) is an English footballer who most recently played for Southern League Premier Central side Tamworth, where he played as a defender or midfielder.

Playing career

Aston Villa
Born in Birmingham, Green started his career as a professional at Aston Villa progressing from the youth ranks. He made it into the Villa squad for pre-season friendlies in the summer of 2006, but was soon released on a free transfer.

Lincoln City
Paul Green was signed by John Schofield for Lincoln City on 22 January 2007 on the same day as Dany N'Guessan. Green scored his first goal for Imps in the 2006/7 season in a 1–1 draw with Hartlepool United. He enjoyed impressive displays during the 2007/8 season, winning the Lincoln City Player of the Year, Players Player and Website Player of the Year awards. He scored his second Lincoln goal in a 2–1 victory at Morecambe towards the end of the season.

Following The Imps relegation to the Conference National, Green was linked with a move back into league football with Oxford United. However, a few days later Green was not offered a new contract with Lincoln City and released.

Tamworth
Following his release from The Imps, Green signed for Tamworth following a successful trial. Green made his debut in the season opener away at Barrow.

Forest Green Rovers

On 6 July 2012, Paul Green joined Forest Green Rovers on a two-year deal. After suffering an injury in pre-season, Green found his debut delayed as he missed the first two months of the campaign. Green eventually made his Forest Green Rovers debut on 9 October 2012, against the team he had left the following campaign, Tamworth, with his new club been defeated 2–1 at home to his old club. Green settled into the club soon after, and went on to pick up three man-of-the-match awards in his first six games.

Following his return from loan with Hereford United, Green returned to the first team and even netted his first goal for Forest Green Rovers against his former club Lincoln City on 16 November 2013 in a 4–1 win. On 28 April 2014, it was announced that he had been released by the club along with nine other players.

Hereford United (loan)
On 29 August 2013, Green joined up with Conference National rivals Hereford United on a one-month loan deal. Paul made his Hereford United debut two days later in a 2–1 win over Welling United. After making seven league appearances, his month-long spell with Hereford United came to and end and he returned to Forest Green Rovers.

Tamworth
It was announced on 8 July 2014 that Paul Green had returned to his former club Tamworth of the Conference North. Following a disappointing start to the season, manager Dale Belford left the club, Green was asked to perform the role of caretaker assistant manager, working alongside Rob Purdie, who took on the role of caretake manager. The pair only led the team for one game, a 1–1 home draw with Colwyn Bay.

Solihull Moors
On 26 May 2017 Solihull Moors manager Liam McDonald announced that the club had signed Green from Tamworth.

Tamworth
It was announced on 23 May 2018 that with the expiry of his contract, Paul Green had left Solihull Moors to return to Tamworth in a player-coach capacity.

On 1 March 2019 it was confirmed that Green had departed the club by mutual consent.

Career statistics

References

External links

1987 births
Living people
Footballers from Birmingham, West Midlands
English footballers
Association football defenders
Aston Villa F.C. players
Lincoln City F.C. players
Tamworth F.C. players
Forest Green Rovers F.C. players
Hereford United F.C. players
Solihull Moors F.C. players
English Football League players
National League (English football) players